Ignaz Kirchner (born Hanns-Peter Kirchner-Wierichs; 13 July 1946 – 26 September 2018) was a German actor who made a career on German-speaking stages, especially at Vienna's Burgtheater where he played for 30 years. A character actor, he worked with leading stage directors. He often played opposite Gert Voss, both in classical drama such as Shakespeare's Antonio, with Voss as Shylock, and as Jago, with Voss as Othello, and especially in black comedies, such as Goldberg in Tabori's Die Goldberg-Variationen (with Voss as Mr. Jay), and in Neil Simon's The Sunshine Boys, Beckett's Endspiel and Genet's Die Zofen. Kirchner and Voss were named Schauspielerpaar des Jahres twice, in 1992 and 1998.

Career 
Born in Wuppertal, Kirchner was raised from age ten in a Jesuit boarding school in Vorarlberg, Austria. He later chose the name of Ignatius of Loyola as his stage name. He first was an apprentice in a book shop, and then trained in acting at the Schauspielschule Bochum. He made his stage debut in 1970, when he was still at university, in Roger Vitrac's Der Coup von Trafalgar staged by Alfred Kirchner.

There he met George Tabori, with whom he would later collaborate at the Burgtheater in Vienna.

In 1987, Kirchner became a member of the Burgtheater, where Peymann was now Intendant. His first role was as Schlomo Herzl in the premiere of Tabori's Mein Kampf. In 1990, he played Doctor Lvov in Chekhov's Ivanov, staged by Peter Zadek, and Jago with Tabori. He and his partner on stage, Gert Voss, were awarded the Actor Duo of the Year (Schauspielerpaar des Jahres) prize by the trade magazine theater heute in 1991 for the roles as Mr. Jay and Goldberg in Tabori's black comedy Die Goldberg-Variationen. The two actors had first played antagonists in classical drama, such as Shylock and Antonio, and Othello and Jago. The paper wrote: "Wie Shylock und Antonio, wie Othello und Jago sind auch Mr. Jay und Goldberg ein sadomasochistisches Männerpaar – eine Kombination wie Herr und Knecht, Vater und Sohn, Laurel und Hardy." (Like Shylock and Antonio, and Othello and Jago, Mr. Jay and Goldberg are also a sadomasochistic male couple, a combination like master and servant, father and son, and Laurel and Hardy.) The two later played together in Neil Simon's The Sunshine Boys (2003), Beckett's Endspiel and Genet's Die Zofen. In 1992, Kirchner appeared as Macduff in Shakespeare's Macbeth, directed by Peymann. He performed solo programs such as Wilhelm Reich's Rede an den kleinen Mann and a series reciting Robert Walser's novels.

In the 1992/93 season, Kirchner moved to the Deutsches Theater Berlin, where he played in Ostrovsky's Der Wald, staged by Thomas Langhoff, and Sosias in Kleist's , staged by Gosch. He then moved to the Hamburg Thalia Theater, appearing in 1995 as the Doctor in Schnitzler's  directed by Flimm, in 1996 Zettel in Shakespeare's Ein Sommernachtstraum with director Jens-Daniel Herzog, and the title role of Molière's Tartuffe, again with Flimm.

From 1997, Kirchner was back at the Burgtheater. He played in 1998 Clov in Beckett's Endspiel alongside Voss as Hamm, staged by Tabori in a production that was invited to the Berliner Theatertreffen. For this performance Kirchner and Voss won again the award Actor Duo of the Year. He played Solange in Die Zofen, directing himself with Voss and his wife Ursula Voss, and Dr. Dorn in Chekhov's Die Möwe with Luc Bondy, both in 2000. A year later, he appeared as Sandperger in Karl Schönherr's Glaube und Heimat with Martin Kušej, and a supervisor and a policeman in Roberto Zucco by Bernard-Marie Koltès with Klaus Michael Grüber. He performed again solo programs such as Walser's Der Spaziergang and Bernhard's Der Stimmenimitator and Minetti. From 2005, he played in a Burgtheater production of 's Der Anatom at the Anatomischer Saal der Bildenden Künste, the play's only role. He appeared at the Salzburg Festival in the speaking role Samiel in Weber's opera Der Freischütz in 2005, staged by Falk Richter.

The major role of Fürst Bolkonskyi in a dramatization at the Burgtheater of Tolstoy's novel Krieg und Frieden won him a nomination for the Nestroy Prize in the category "best leading role" in 2010.

Kirchner died on 26 September 2018 after a long illness.

Filmography 
1977:  (directed by Wolf Gremm) – Pfleger
1989: Hanna Monster, Liebling (directed by Christian Berger) – Rudolf
1995: Jailbirds (directed by Detlev Buck) – Mohrmann
1999: Sonnenallee (directed by Leander Haußmann) – Onkel Heinz
1999: Klemperer – Ein Leben in Deutschland (TV Series)
2000: Zimmer mit Frühstück (TV Movie, directed by Michael Verhoeven – Rudolf
2005: NVA (directed by Leander Haußmann) – Futterknecht
2005:  (TV Movie, directed by Leander Haußmann) – Herr Miller
2007:  (TV Movie, directed by Hermine Huntgeburth) – Lehrer Mohren
2009:  (directed by Leander Haußmann) – Victor Semlitsch (final film role)

Awards 
 1991 – For Jago in Othello:  of Vienna
 1992 – Actor Duo of the Year (with Gert Voss) for Tabori's Die Goldberg-Variationen
 1998 – Actor Duo of the Year (with Gert Voss) for Beckett's Endspiel
 2001 – Nomination for Nestroy Prize for best supporting role
 2004 – Silver 
 2008 – 
 2010 – Nomination for Nestroy Prize for best leading role

Literature

References

External links 
 
 
 
 Schauspieler Ignaz Kirchner gestorben / Immer an der Grenze zur Verrücktheit nachtkritik.de 27 September 2018

German male stage actors
German male film actors
1946 births
2018 deaths
Actors from Wuppertal
German expatriates in Austria